Pseudotelphusa occidentella is a moth of the family Gelechiidae. It is found in southern France, Spain, Portugal and Morocco.

References

Moths described in 1999
Pseudotelphusa